Fucus serratus is a seaweed of the north Atlantic Ocean, known as toothed wrack, serrated wrack, or saw rack.

Description and reproduction
Fucus serratus is a robust alga, olive-brown in colour and similar to Fucus vesiculosus and Fucus spiralis. It branches irregularly and dichotomously. The flattened blade has a distinct midrib and is readily distinguished from related taxa by the serrated edge of the fronds. It does not have air vesicles, such as are found in F. vesiculosus, nor is it spirally twisted like F. spiralis. Male and female receptacles are on different plants. The lamina shows cryptostomata – small cavities which produce colourless hairs.

The reproductive bodies form in conceptacles sunken in receptacles towards the tips on the branches. In these conceptacles oogonia and antheridia are produced and after meiosis the oogonia and antheridia are released. Fertilisation follows and the zygote develops, settles and grows directly into the diploid sporophyte plant.

Distribution
Fucus serratus is found along the Atlantic coast of Europe from Svalbard to Portugal, in the Canary Islands and on the shores of north-east America. It was introduced to Iceland and the Faroe Islands by humans within the last 1000 years where it was first noted in a phycological survey in 1900.

Ecology
Fucus serratus grows very well on slow draining shores where it may occupy up to a third of the area of the entire seashore. It often dominates the rocky parts of the lower shore, exposed or immersed in rock pools, on all but the most exposed shores. "…the littoral zone is characterised especially by such Phaeophyta (brown algae) as Pelvetia, Ascophyllum, Egregia, Fucus and Laminaria, particularly when the shore is rocky".

Uses
Fucus serratus is used in Ireland and France for the production of cosmetics and for thalassotherapy. In the Western Isles of Scotland, it is harvested for use as a liquid fertiliser.

References

Species described in 1753
Taxa named by Carl Linnaeus
Fucaceae